The 2014 Allan Cup was the Canadian championship of senior ice hockey.  This was the 106th year the Allan Cup was awarded.  The tournament was contended in Dundas, Ontario from April 14 to April 19, 2014 and hosted by the Dundas Real McCoys of the Ontario Hockey Federation.

The Real McCoys went a perfect 4–0 in the tournament and defeated the Clarenville Caribous 3–2 in overtime in the championship game to win their first Allan Cup.

Participants
Dundas Real McCoys (Host)
18-4-2 record, 1st in ACH.
Defeated Stoney Creek Generals 4-0, Lost to Brantford Blast 2-4.
Bentley Generals (Pacific)
21-3-0 record, 1st in ChHL.
Defeated Stony Plain Eagles 4-0, Defeated Innisfail Eagles 4-0, Defeated Powell River Regals 3-0.
South East Prairie Thunder (West)
Defeated Shellbrook Elks 3-0.
Kenora Thistles (HNO)
Automatically qualified as there is no Quebec teams.
5-0-0 exhibition record.
Brantford Blast (OHF)
16-7-1 record, 3rd in ACH.
Defeated Whitby Dunlops 4-2, Defeated Dundas Real McCoys 4-2.
Clarenville Caribous (Atlantic)
Conception Bay North Cee Bee Stars decline, Caribous 2012 NLSHL Runner-up.
13-6-5 record, 2nd in NLSHL.
Defeated Mount Pearl Blades 4-1, Lost to Grand Falls-Windsor Cataracts 2-4.

Round robin

Results

Championship Round

Quarter and Semi-finals

Final

Awards
Bill Saunders Award (Tournament MVP): Mike Mole (Dundas Real McCoys)
All Star Team
Goalie: Mike Mole (Dundas Real McCoys) 
Defense: Luke Gallant (Clarenville Caribous)
Defense: Simon Mangos (Dundas Real McCoys)
Forward: Ryan Christie (Dundas Real McCoys)
Forward: Cam Fraser (Clarenville Caribous)
Forward: Matt Quinn (Clarenville Caribous)

References

External links
Official Allan Cup Site 

2014 Allan Cup
2013–14 in Canadian ice hockey